Membranoproliferative glomerulonephritis (MPGN) is a type of glomerulonephritis caused by deposits in the kidney glomerular mesangium and basement membrane (GBM) thickening, activating complement and damaging the glomeruli.

MPGN accounts for approximately 4% of primary renal causes of nephrotic syndrome in children and 7% in adults.

It should not be confused with membranous glomerulonephritis, a condition in which the basement membrane is thickened, but the mesangium is not.

Type 
There are three types of MPGN, but this classification is becoming obsolete as the causes of this pattern are becoming understood.

Type I
Type I, the most common by far, is caused by immune complexes depositing in the kidney. It is characterised by subendothelial and mesangial immune deposits.

It is believed to be associated with the classical complement pathway.

Type II

Also called recently as ‘C3 nephropathy’
The preferred name is "dense deposit disease." Most cases of dense deposit disease do not show a membranoproliferative pattern. A 2012 review considers DDD to be in a continuum with C3 glomerulonephritis, one reason the use of the type I to type III classification system is falling out of favour.

Most cases are associated with the dysregulation of the alternative complement pathway.

DDD is associated with deposition of complement C3 within the glomeruli with little or no staining for immunoglobulin. The presence of C3 without significant immunoglobulin suggested to early investigators that DDD was due to abnormal activation of the complement alternative pathway (AP). There is now strong evidence that DDD is caused by uncontrolled AP activation.

Spontaneous remissions of MPGN II are rare; approximately half of those affected with MPGN II will progress to end stage renal disease within ten years.

In many cases, people with MPGN II can develop drusen caused by deposits within Bruch's membrane beneath the retinal pigment epithelium of the eye. Over time, vision can deteriorate, and subretinal neovascular membranes, macular detachment, and central serous retinopathy can develop.

Type III
Type III is very rare, it is characterized by a mixture of subepithelial and subendothelial immune and/or complement deposits. These deposits elicit an immune response, causing damage to cells and structures within their vicinity. Has similar pathological findings of Type I disease.

A candidate gene has been identified on chromosome 1.

Complement component 3 is seen under immunofluorescence. it is associated with complement receptor 6 deficiency.

Pathology

Membranoproliferative glomerulonephritis involves deposits at the intraglomerular mesangium.

It is also the main hepatitis C associated nephropathy.

It also is related to a number of autoimmune diseases, prominently systemic lupus erythematosus (SLE), Class IV. Also found with Sjögren syndrome, rheumatoid arthritis, inherited complement deficiencies (esp C3 deficiency), scleroderma, Celiac disease.

The histomorphologic differential diagnosis includes transplant glomerulopathy and thrombotic microangiopathies.

Diagnosis
The GBM is rebuilt on top of the deposits, causing a "tram tracking" appearance under the microscope. Mesangial cellularity is increased.

Treatment
Primary MPGN is treated with steroids, plasma exchange and other immunosuppressive drugs.
Secondary MPGN is treated by treating the associated infection, autoimmune disease or neoplasms. Pegylated interferon and ribavirin are useful in reducing viral load.

See also
Diffuse proliferative nephritis

References

External links

 
 
 Membranoproliferative_GN at Nephropathology tutorial
 MP GN Pathophysiology discusses the nephritic auto-antibodies/factors

Nephrology
Hepatitis C virus-associated diseases